The Embassy of the Philippines in Hanoi is the diplomatic mission of the Republic of the Philippines to the Socialist Republic of Vietnam. It is located at 27B Tran Hung Dao Street, Hanoi. The embassy provides consular services and deals with diplomatic affairs. It opened on 20 August 1977 after diplomatic relations between the Philippines and Vietnam were established on 12 July 1976.

References

Philippines
Hanoi
Philippines–Vietnam relations